The 8th NACAC Under-23 Championships in Athletics were held at the Hillside Stadium in Kamloops, British Columbia, Canada from August 8–10, 2014. A total of 44 track and field events were contested, divided evenly between the sexes.

Medal summary

For medal winners and complete results, see footnote

Men

Women

Medal table (unofficial)

Participation
According to an unofficial count, 197 athletes from 19 countries participated.

 (1)
 (5)
 (3)
 (2)
 (1)
 (37)
 (9)
 (4)
 (4)
 (15)
 (14)
 (2)
 (10)
 (2)
 (1)
 (5)
 (2)
 (77)
 (3)

External links
 Official website

References

NACAC Under-23 Championships in Athletics
NACAC Under-23 Championships
NACAC Under-23 Championships
Sport in Kamloops
International track and field competitions hosted by Canada
NACAC Under-23
2014 in youth sport
August 2014 sports events in Canada